Alida van Houten (1868-1960) was a Dutch painter.

Biography 
Van Houten was born on 22 August 1868 in Groningen. She was the sister of the artist Gerrit van Houten. She studied at the Academie Minerva. Her teachers included  and Dirk de Vries Lam.

Van Houten's work was included in the 1939 exhibition and sale Onze Kunst van Heden (Our Art of Today) at the Rijksmuseum in Amsterdam.

Van Houten died on 2 December 1960 in Groningen.

References

External links 
images of Houten's work on MutualArt

1868 births
1960 deaths
20th-century Dutch women artists
Dutch painters